Chic magazine, stylized as CHIC, is a women's lifestyle magazine published in English and other languages. The launch issue was in spring 2012, and published by Chic Critique, a female group with emphasis on quality photography. The magazine takes the slogan "For Women Who Love Photography". 

CHIC magazine is also published in local editions in various languages including in Mexico, China, Singapore and Indonesia.

References

Lifestyle magazines
Magazines established in 2012